Zhuhai International School (ZIS) is an international school on Qi Ao Island in Zhuhai, Guangdong, China. The school offers International Baccalaureate courses from Nursery level to Year 13 for students ages 3 to 18.

References

External links
 Zhuhai International School

International schools in Guangdong
International Baccalaureate schools in China
Buildings and structures in Zhuhai
Private schools in Guangdong